Richard Joseph Meagher (born November 2, 1953) is a Canadian former ice hockey player. Meagher played almost 700 games in the National Hockey League (NHL) with the Montreal Canadiens, Hartford Whalers, New Jersey Devils and St. Louis Blues. He won the Selke Trophy in 1990 with the Blues.  he is a scout for the St. Louis Blues.

Playing career
Not drafted by a National Hockey League (NHL) team, Meagher's playing career began with the Boston University Terriers. He played four seasons at Boston University, winning numerous awards on the way, including being named to both the First and Second All-Star teams twice. Meagher was named to the NCAA East All-American team three times, and also was placed on the NCAA Championship All-Tournament Team.

In 1977–78, Meagher was signed by the Montreal Canadiens as a free agent. He spent the first three years in the American Hockey League (AHL) with the Nova Scotia Voyageurs. In 1979–80, Meagher played for the first time in the NHL, playing a total of two games for the Canadiens. The following season, Meagher was traded to the Hartford Whalers. With Hartford, he recorded 17 points in 27 games, but still played most of the season with their AHL affiliate, the Binghamton Whalers. The 1981–82 season saw Meagher play full-time in the NHL, as recorded 24 goals while centering a line with Don Nachbaur and Warren Miller. In 1982–83, Meagher played in only four games with the Whalers before being traded to the New Jersey Devils. Meagher played three seasons with New Jersey, until 1984–85, when he was traded to the St. Louis Blues.

It was in St. Louis that Meagher had his most productive years, playing on a line with star Bernie Federko. He was a two-way forward and a top penalty killer in the league at that time. In 1989–90, a season in which he was also named team captain of the Blues, Meagher received the Frank J. Selke Trophy as the league's top defensive forward. After 1990–91, Meagher retired due to injuries.

Awards and honors

Metro OHA-B Rookie of the Year awards winner in 1972.
Frank J. Selke Trophy winner in 1990.

Career statistics

References

External links

1953 births
Living people
AHCA Division I men's ice hockey All-Americans
Boston University Terriers men's ice hockey players
Canadian ice hockey centres
Frank Selke Trophy winners
Hartford Whalers players
Ice hockey people from Ontario
Maine Mariners players
Montreal Canadiens players
New Jersey Devils players
Nova Scotia Voyageurs players
St. Louis Blues coaches
St. Louis Blues players
St. Louis Blues scouts
Sportspeople from Belleville, Ontario
Undrafted National Hockey League players
Canadian ice hockey coaches
St. Louis Blues announcers